Oro Fino is Spanish for "fine gold" and may refer to:

Oro Fino, California, a gold mining camp in Siskiyou County, California
Oro Fino, the original title of the Spanish film Fine Gold
Orofino, Idaho
Orofino Creek